Phlox glabriflora is an annual species of Phlox found in southern Texas.  It is commonly called Rio Grande phlox.

References

glabriflora
Flora of North America